Algezares is a village and a district in Murcia, Spain. It is part of the municipality of Murcia and is almost located in the centre. It has an area of 24.74 km2, and had a population of 5,620 in 2020.

Demographics 
8.896% inhabitants are foreigners – 3.91% come from other country of Europe, 2.24% are Africans, 2.49% are Americans and 0.249% are Asians. The table below shows the population trends of the district in the 21st by its five-year periods.

References 

Murcia
Populated places in the Region of Murcia